was a Japanese daimyō of the Edo period, who ruled the Hiroshima Domain. He held the title of Aki no kami. His childhood name was Iwamatsu (岩松).

During the 47 rōnin incident, Tsunanaga sent a messenger to Akō, which was ruled by a branch family of the Hiroshima Asano, and recommended that Ōishi Kuranosuke peacefully surrender the castle to the shogunate's envoys.

His daughter married the court noble Ichijō Kaneka.

Family
 Father: Asano Tsunaakira
 Mother: Kujō Aiko (d. 1659), daughter of the regent Kujō Michifusa (son of the regent Kujō Yukiie and Toyotomi Sadako), and Matsudaira Tsuruhime (daughter of Matsudaira Tadanao, 2nd Daimyo of Fukui Domain and Tokugawa Katsuhime, daughter of the 2nd shōgun Tokugawa Hidetada and Asai Oeyo))
 Wife: Tokugawa Atehime (1666–1683), daughter of Tokugawa Mitsutomo, 2nd Daimyo of Owari Domain
 Children:
 Asano Yoshinaga by Atehime
 Asano Nagakata (1693–1744)
 Nakagawa Hisayoshi (1708–1743)
 Umehime married Ogasawara Tadamoto of Kokura Domain
 daughter married Kujō Morotaka
 daughter married the regent Ichijō Kaneka
 daughter married Matsudaira Sukekuni of Hamamatsu Domain
 daughter married Matsudaira Yoshikata of Mutsu-Yanagawa Domain
 daughter married Mizuno Tadamoto of Matsumoto Domain later married Mori Naganari of Akō Domain later married Kawaha Tadateru

References

1659 births
1708 deaths
Daimyo
Asano clan